Daiana Pacheco (born 4 April 2002) is an Argentinian field hockey player.

Hockey career 
In 2021, Pacheco was called into the senior national women's team.

References

External links

Argentine female field hockey players
Living people
2002 births
Field hockey players from Buenos Aires
21st-century Argentine women